Agricultural Bank may refer to:

 Agricultural Bank of China
 Bankwest, previously called Agricultural Bank of Western Australia
 Norwegian State Agriculture Bank
 Rosselkhozbank, Agricultural bank in Russia
 Krung Thai Bank, previously called Agricultural Bank
 Agricultural Bank of Greece (Αγροτική Τράπεζα της Ελλάδος), also referred to as ATEbank
 Nonghyup Bank, Agricultural bank in South Korea
 Agricultural Bank of Libya
 Agricultural Bank of Iceland